María Cristina Kronfle Gómez (born November 22, 1985) is an Ecuadorian lawyer and politician. She served as a member of the National Assembly of Ecuador from 2009 to 2017.

Biography
María Cristina Kronfle was born in Guayaquil on November 22, 1985, the daughter of Víctor Kronfle Cabrera and María Cristina Gómez. She obtained her law degree from the Catholic University of Santiago de Guayaquil.

From the age of 18, she promoted transportation assistance for voting by people with disabilities in the city of Guayaquil, starting by writing opinion letters to national newspapers, which aroused the interest of other people linked to the issue. She conducted campaigns for the visibility of this social sector, called "Campaign Vote".

Political career

Kronfle began her political life as a candidate for councilor of Guayaquil for the Ethics and Democracy Network (RED) of Martha Roldós in 2006. Later she was part of the Constituent Assembly of 2007 for the Social Christian Party (PSC), where she was the youngest member at twenty years old. Having been born with a physical disability that prevents her from walking, she promoted constitutional articles that guaranteed the rights of persons with disabilities.

In the Assembly she was unanimously appointed as president of the Occasional Commission for Persons with Disabilities. She was the promoter of the Organic Law on Disabilities, approved unanimously by the Assembly in June 2012.

She was reelected as an Assembly member for Guayas in 2013, and remained in office until 2017.

Personal life

References

External links

 

1985 births
Ecuadorian disability rights activists
Ecuadorian women activists
21st-century Ecuadorian lawyers
Women members of the National Assembly (Ecuador)
Ecuadorian women lawyers
Living people
Members of the National Congress (Ecuador)
People from Guayaquil
Politicians with paraplegia
Social Christian Party (Ecuador) politicians
Universidad Católica de Santiago de Guayaquil alumni
21st-century Ecuadorian women politicians
21st-century Ecuadorian politicians